The Wu Family Shrines, of which the Wu Liang Shrine is the best known, was the family shrine of the Wu clan of the Eastern Han dynasty. The shrines contain a vast amount of relief carvings.

Three walls of Wu Liang's shrine were still standing as late as the 11th century, which is the reason that the site of all the family shrines are often called after him. The shrine to Wu Liang (78-151 AD) was built in 151 AD in what is now Jiaxiang County of southwestern Shandong province.

References

External links 

 Barbieri, Anthony (2019). Virtual Tour of Wuzhai Shan Site, 2nd Century CE (v. 2.0). University of California, Santa Barbara.

Ancestral shrines in China
Major National Historical and Cultural Sites in Shandong
Han dynasty architecture
Cemeteries in China